Kuozui Motors is a Taiwanese manufacturing company that builds Toyotas under license for the domestic market. It began as a co-ownership of Hino Motors and Hotai Motor. The corporation was spun off and became independent in the 1980s. Toyota still invests heavily in the corporation's production sector, expanding Taiwanese plants.

It was founded as a joint venture, Huatung Motors, Ltd. by General Motors and the Ministry of Economic Affairs, Ministry of National Defense. GM withdrew in 1983. Hotai Motor, based in Taiwan, then stepped in, and in 1984, along with Hino Motors, established Kuozui Motors. In 2008, Toyota and Hotai Motor increased its stake in the company to form the majority ownership.



Current models

Manufactured locally

Guanyin Plant 

 Toyota Sienta
 Toyota Town Ace
 Toyota Vios
 Toyota Yaris
Hino bus chassis
 Hino 300 series
 Hino 500 series
 Hino 700 series

Zhongli Plant 

Toyota Corolla Altis
 Toyota Corolla Cross

Imported 
 Toyota 86 
 Toyota Alphard
 Toyota C-HR
Toyota Camry
Toyota Coaster
 Toyota Corolla Sport
 Toyota HiAce
 Toyota Granvia
Toyota GR Yaris
 Toyota Hilux
 Toyota Land Cruiser Prado
 Toyota Prius
 Toyota Prius PHV
 Toyota RAV4
 Toyota Sienna
 Toyota Supra

Discontinued models 

 Toyota Auris
Toyota Corona (1992–2002)
 Toyota HiAce Solemio (1991–2005)
 Toyota Innova (2007–2015)
 Toyota Previa (2001–2019)
 Toyota Prius α (2012–2021)
 Toyota Prius C (2013–2020)
 Toyota Tercel (1995–2003)
 Toyota Zace/Zace Surf (1988–2007)

See also
 Transportation in Taiwan
 List of Taiwanese automakers
 List of companies of Taiwan

References

External links 

 

1984 establishments in Taiwan
Toyota
Hino Motors vehicles
Car manufacturers of Taiwan
Vehicle manufacturing companies established in 1984